Below is the list of the Parliamentary terms of Turkey from 1920 to onwards. The duration of each term is marked by the corresponding election, except for the ending of the 11th and 16th parliamentary terms which ended as a result of the coups of 1960 and 1980 respectively.

Notes

References

Politics of Turkey
 
Turkey politics-related lists